Staunton is an unincorporated place and railway point in Unorganized Thunder Bay District in northwestern Ontario, Canada.

It is on the Canadian National Railway transcontinental main line, between Savant Lake to the west and Flindt Landing to the east, has a passing track, and is passed but not served by Via Rail transcontinental Canadian trains.

References

Communities in Thunder Bay District